Patim is a town in the southwestern part of the island of Fogo, Cape Verde. It is situated 8 km southeast of the island capital São Filipe. At the 2010 census its population was 876. Its elevation is 535 meters. It is 2 km east of Luzia Nunes and 2.5 km southwest of Monte Grande. Its climate is arid. Average temperature is 20.5 °C. Average precipitation is 268 mm.

See also
List of cities and towns in Cape Verde

References

Geography of Fogo, Cape Verde
São Filipe, Cape Verde
Towns in Cape Verde